Ujire is a town near Dharmasthala. It is in Belthangady taluk of Dakshina Kannada district. Ujire is an important junction for travelers in this region. The road at Ujire deviates to Dharmasthala (towards Hassan, Bengaluru), Kottigehara (towards Horanadu, Chikkamagaluru) and Belthangady (towards Mangaluru).

Education
The place is famous for its educational institutes, most of them belonging to SDME (Shree Dharmasthala Manjunatheswara Educational) Trust.

 SDM Pre-University and Degree College
 SDM Residential PU college
 SDM College of Naturopathy and Yogic Sciences: A college in India, providing degree in Naturopathy and Yogic Science.
 SDM Institute Of Technology: Engineering college that was established in 2007.
 SDM Polytechnic Ujire: It is a diploma college.
 Prasanna College of Education
 Prasanna College of Engineering and Technology
 SDM Primary and Secondary School
 Anugraha English Medium School
 SDM English Medium School
 Siddavana Gurukula
 Prasanna College of Ayurveda

Hospitals
 SDM Hospital
 Benaka Health Centre
Ashwini Health Centre 
Shakti clinic
Anugraha ENT clinic.
Shree dental clinic

Tourism
Ujire is known for its scenic beauty. This is the starting point for most of the trekking places nearby. Some of them are mentioned below:
 Narasimhagada Fort (5 km) which was occupied in 1794 by Tippu Sultan. It is 1788 ft above sea level and was formerly called Narasimha Ghada. It is also known as Jamalabad or Gadaikallu.
 Bandaje Falls (15 km)
 Ermai falls (10 km)
  Charmadi Ghat, one of the most scenic ghat section of Karnataka with high supine gradient, requiring more hairpin bends.

Transportation 
Ujire has bus facility to various places like Dharmastala, Mangalore, Bangalore etc. There are many KSRTC and private buses to various places.

Places of worship
 Sri Janardhanaswami Temple: Sri Janardhanaswami Temple is one of the main attractions of Ujire town. The temple is dedicated to Lord Janardhana (Vishnu). This is an 800-year-old temple and featured as one of the oldest of South Canara or Dakshina Kannada district.
 Surya Sadashivarudra Temple, Nada: Sadashivarudra Temple is in beautiful surroundings 6 km from Ujire in Nada village. Devotees from all-over Karnataka visit here to offer clay toys as offering to the deity.
Sri Santhana Priya Naga Kshetra:- Sri Santhana Priya Naga Kshetra Temple is one of the main attractions of Ujire town. The temple is dedicated to Lord Naga Devate (Subramanya, Kanya Rakteshwari, Naga Brahma). This is several years old temple in Dakshina Kannada district.
 St. Antony Church, Ujire
 Mohiddin Juma Masjid 
 Tangai Sri Durgaparameshwari Temple 
 Shri Rama Mandira
 Mahamaayi Maari gudi
 St. George Church (Syro-Malabar Diocese of Belthangady)
 Shree Vyagrachamundi Temple Odala, Ujire

Image gallery

External links
 
Dharmasthala

Cities and towns in Dakshina Kannada district